The Minister for Ports was a ministry first established in 1975 in the Coalition Lewis–Cutler ministry and abolished in 2011. It has had three incarnations and was renamed as the Minster for Ports and Waterways in the First Iemma ministry in 2005. In 2011 the portfolio was merged with that of Roads to form the portfolio of Roads and Ports.

Role and responsibilities
Ports had previously been a responsibility of the Minister for Public Works and both portfolios were held by the same minister for the first 9 years until 1984. The Minister was responsible for the investigation, planning, design, construction and maintenance of port facilities (except fishing, tourist and recreational facilities), port operation and vessel operations. By 1979 the minister’s responsibilities were drawn together in the Maritime Services Board. From the seventh Wran ministry in 1984 until the Unsworth ministry in 1987 the responsibility for ports was combined with the portfolio for public works. The Minister was responsible for the co-ordination of two major organisations and various statutory bodies, administered via numerous Acts, including the Public Works Act, 1912 , Maritime Services Act, 1935, Navigation Act, 1901 , Sydney Harbour Trust Act, 1900 and New Darling Harbour Act, 1984. Other legislation covered water supply administration; land acquisition; engineering and ship building; construction materials production, supply and distribution (bricks, tiles); prevention of pollution within ports; wharfage and tonnage rates. The main agencies administered by the portfolio were the Department of Public Works and Maritime Services Board. Statutory bodies included the Board of Architects of NSW; Light, Heat and Power Committee; State Dockyard; various port advisory committees, water supply boards and drainage unions/trusts. The portfolio ceased when Laurie Brereton resigned on 26 November 1987. Public Works became a separate portfolio and the Minister for Transport took on the responsibility for Ports.

Ports became a separate Ministry again in the third Fahey ministry. The minister took responsibility for the Maritime Services Board (later the various Waterways Authorities) and a number of statutory bodies. The portfolio was abolished in the third Carr ministry and absorbed by Transport.

The portfolio of Ports had a third incarnation following a re-shuffle of the fourth Carr ministry in 2005 and the title was changed to Ports and Waterways in the First Iemma ministry in August 2005. The portfolio was abolished in the O'Farrell ministry in 2011 when it was combined with Roads to form the portfolio of Roads and Ports.

List of ministers

References

Ports and Waterways